Jakup Veseli (aka Vejsel Margëllëçi) was a leading figure in the Albanian independence movement one of the delegates of Albanian Declaration of Independence, representing the region of Chameria.

He was born in Margariti,, modern-day Greece, then Ottoman Empire.

References

Year of birth missing
Year of death missing
Cham Albanians
All-Albanian Congress delegates
People from Thesprotia